The Alliance for Romanian Unity (AUR) was a political alliance in Romania.

History
The AUR was formed as an alliance of the Republican Party (PR) and the Romanian National Unity Party (PUNR). It received 2.1% of the Chamber of Deputies vote in the 1990 general elections, winning nine seats. It also received 2.2% of the Senate vote, winning two seats. All seats were taken by the PUNR.

The two parties contested the 1992 general elections separately; the PUNR nominated Gheorghe Funar as its presidential candidates, whilst the PR put forward Ioan Mânzatu. Funar finished third with 10.8% of the vote, whilst Mânzatu finishing last of the six candidates with 3%. The PUNR won 14 Senate seats and 30 Chamber seats, whilst the PR failed to win seats in either house.

Electoral history

Legislative elections

References

Defunct political party alliances in Romania